HMS Lagos was a  of the Royal Navy. She was named in honour of the Battle of Lagos which happened in 1759 off the coast of Portugal, between the Royal Navy and a French fleet, resulting in a British victory.

History
Lagos was built by Cammell Laird of Birkenhead. She was one of ten Battle-class destroyers ordered under the 1942 naval estimates. She was launched on 4 August 1944 and commissioned on 2 November 1945. Her pennant number was originally 'R44', which was later (post-1948) changed to 'D44' when the Royal Navy rationalised the numbering system.

Deployment

Post World War II
In 1946, after the end of hostilities, Lagos deployed to the Far East with the 19th Destroyer Flotilla to join the British Pacific Fleet. Her journey included stops at various ports, such as for example, Port Said (March), Colombo, Singapore, Hong Kong (May), Shanghai (June), before finally reaching Japan in July 1946.

After visiting Japan Lagos, along with the rest of the Flotilla, began the journey home to the UK, once again visiting many ports on fly-the-flag visits, mainly in Malaya. Upon returning to the UK in early 1947, Lagos was placed in Reserve.

In 1957, Lagos joined the 1st Destroyer Squadron, seeing service with the Home and Mediterranean Fleets. The following year, Lagos, with the rest of the squadron, joined the Far East Fleet. In 1959, following the collision between sister ship  and the Indian cruiser , Lagos and the destroyer , towed Hogue to Singapore.

Decommissioning
In 1960, Lagos was decommissioned, being scrapped at Bo'ness in 1967.

References

Publications
 

 

Battle-class destroyers of the Royal Navy
Ships built on the River Mersey
1944 ships
Cold War destroyers of the United Kingdom